This a list of the 206 members of the Legislature XIX of Italy of the Italian Senate. Two hundred of them were elected in the snap 2022 Italian general election and assumed office on 13 October 2022, while six are senators for life.

Seat division

Current composition

Former senators

References 

Members of the Senate of the Republic (Italy)
Senators of Legislature XIX of Italy
Italy